The Onion House is an innovative home designed and hand-built by American architect Kendrick Bangs Kellogg, in Holualoa, Hawaii, (near Kailua-Kona) for the McCormick family (of McCormick spice fame), in 1962-3.

It is an example of Organic Architecture, or Metaphoric architecture. The arched roof panels resemble a shell, or an onion, while the lava rock walls reference ancient Hawaiian temples, or heiau, which are found along the Kona coast. The roof panels are translucent like onion skin, transmitting sunlight into the house during the day and glowing at night.  With no exterior walls, the outdoors are integrated with the living areas, separated only by screen or stained glass. A 70-foot pool wraps around the two main structures.

Elizabeth McCormick von Beck commissioned Kellogg to design the home, when he was in his mid-twenties.  When they could not find a contractor willing to attempt the project, Kellogg moved to Kona, Hawaii, to construct it himself.  James Hubbell collaborated with Kellogg on construction of the home, with Hubbell creating 29 stained glass windows and a mosaic tile dining table.  William Slatton created metal-work details throughout the home, including the entrance gate and the spires topping the three structures.

The roofs of the two main structures are supported by a series of cast-in-place concrete arches, radiating out from a central fireplace in each building.  Translucent panels made of fiberglass, called Alsynite, curve between each concrete arch.  These roofs are crowned with hand-cut redwood shingles, topped by steel spires.

Massive lava rock walls form a high terrace overlooking the ocean.  These walls flow uninterrupted from the outside to the interior, right through the glass and screen walls.  These rock walls are thicker at the bottom, slanting upward like the walls of Hawaiian temples, or heiau.  This very site-specific architecture works in the gentle climate of Kona, where trade winds are buffered by Mount Hualalai, and temperatures range between the 70's and 80's.

This was the third home Kellogg designed, and one of his best-known buildings.  Kellogg's architectural vision was heavily influenced by Frank Lloyd Wright. Kellogg calls the Onion house his 'breakaway house' where he moved away from the horizontal planes that characterized much of Wright's work. Kellogg's aesthetic has been described as "an architecture so full of life that it seems to breathe."

Elizabeth McCormick von Beck was the niece of the founder of the McCormick spice company.  The home was purchased in 1984 by the original owner's niece, Beth McCormick, who renovated the home over a period of 34 years. In 2017 the home was sold to the current owners, while Beth McCormick remains involved providing advice and architectural guidance.

In 2000, Beth McCormick began sharing the Onion House with the public as a vacation rental property, and it remains available for guests to visit to this day with the new owners. Information on visiting the Onion House can be found on the Onion House's official website as well as VRBO.

References

External links 

Architecture in Hawaii
Houses in Hawaii County, Hawaii